Ian Plenderleith  (born 27 September 1943) was a member of the Bank of England's Monetary Policy Committee from June 1997 to May 2002.

He was a deputy governor of the South African Reserve Bank from January 2003 until 2005.

He is a former Chairman of Morgan Stanley since 2011 and the Board of Governors at Reed's School, Cobham.

References

Columbia Business School alumni
1943 births
Living people
People educated at King Edward's School, Birmingham